Jordan James Chattenton Thomas (born 2 January 2001) is an English professional footballer who plays as a defender for Hampton & Richmond Borough. He is primarily a right-back, but can also play as a left-back.

Born in London, Thomas started his career at Charlton Athletic before signing a scholarship at Huddersfield Town.

Club career

Charlton Athletic 
Thomas joined Charlton Athletic at 6 years old, where he then signed for their academy at the age of 9. He played there for 5 years until he was released at the age of 15 years.

Huddersfield Town 
Thomas signed a scholarship at Huddersfield Town at the age of 16 after playing 1 season in the Kent Youth League for Erith & Belvedere F.C. Thomas made his Huddersfield Town U23s debut on 11 September 2017 against Bristol City U23s.

Norwich City
Aged 18 years Thomas signed his first professional contract for Championship club Norwich City in January 2018 making his Norwich U23s debut on 22 January against  Bournemouth U23s. 
In the 2019-20 season, Thomas had three times been named as an unused substitute before on 26 July 2020 Daniel Farke gave Thomas his Premier League debut in the last few minutes against Manchester City in a season that saw Norwich City relegated from the top-flight of English football.

Leyton Orient loan spell
In September 2020, Thomas joined Leyton Orient on loan for the 2020–21 season. He made his debut in League Two against Colchester United on 14 November 2020. He played just four times during his loan before being released by Norwich at the end of the season.

Non-league
Thomas joined Barnet on a two-year deal in July 2021. In March 2023, he joined Hampton & Richmond Borough on a permanent contract.

Personal life
He is the brother of Bristol Rovers player Dominic Thomas who retired through injury.

Career statistics

References

External links

2001 births
Living people
English footballers
Association football defenders
Charlton Athletic F.C. players
Erith & Belvedere F.C. players
Huddersfield Town A.F.C. players
Norwich City F.C. players
Leyton Orient F.C. players
Barnet F.C. players
Hampton & Richmond Borough F.C. players
Premier League players
English Football League players
National League (English football) players